Peters Branch is a stream in Wayne County in the U.S. state of Missouri. It is a tributary of Hubble Creek. Peters Branch has the name of William Peters, original owner of the site.

See also
List of rivers of Missouri

References

Rivers of Wayne County, Missouri
Rivers of Missouri